Little Munden Primary School is a Church of England voluntary controlled primary school in the village of Dane End, near Ware in Hertfordshire. It is a one-form entry school educating boys and girls aged between four and 11 years. There are four classes organised by age. The school roll varies but is generally between 85 and 100.

History
The school was founded in 1819 at All Saints Church in Little Munden by the Reverend J P Reynolds, who served as rector from 1819 to 1831. Reynolds helped to raise the finance for a new school on a separate site. The school was duly opened in 1826. A small extension for infants was added in 1869, and the school was further enlarged in 1900, 1970, and 1973.

Little Munden was originally a parish school serving children of all ages. In 1945, following the 1944 Education Act, under which it was stipulated that all children over 11 years old should attend secondary school, Little Munden became a primary school.

Premises
The school was designated as a Grade II listed building by English Heritage in 1984 as it is an early example of a parish school.

Unusually, a footpath with public right-of-way runs between the school buildings, requiring the route to be kept unobstructed.

Academic standards
The Ofsted report of the inspection in February 2014 rated the overall effectiveness of the school as 'Good', point two on a four-point scale. It said "Achievement is good. From low starting points, pupils make good progress to reach average standards at the end of Year 6." and "Teaching is good. Teachers make learning enjoyable so pupils readily come to school." The assessment of 'Good' was reiterated in the report of the Short Inspection in December 2017.

Activities
In 2007, Years Five and Six took part in a pilot project, working with Hertford Museum, to create an exhibition about their locality covering the period 1830–1930.

The school benefits from an active PTFA, Friends of Little Munden, who raise money for the school via a range of community events held throughout the year. These include the Dane End Summer Festival and Christmas Parade.

References

External links
Official website

Primary schools in Hertfordshire
Educational institutions established in 1819
Grade II listed buildings in Hertfordshire
Grade II listed educational buildings
Church of England primary schools in the Diocese of St Albans
1819 establishments in England
Voluntary controlled schools in England